CPM may refer to:

Advertising
Cost per mille, the advertising cost per thousand views
Cost per thousand impressions, the online advertising equivalent

Management
Certified practising marketer, a qualification for Australian marketers
Certified Property Manager
Certified Public Manager
Comparable Profits Method, a commonly used transfer pricing method for managing internal sales between two divisions of the same company
Corporate performance management is another name for business performance management used in Gartner reports on software systems
Critical path method, an algorithm for scheduling project activities

Organizations

Asia
The Pentecostal Mission (formerly Ceylon Pentecostal Mission), Sri Lanka
Communist Party of India (Marxist)
Communist Party of Malaya, the Malayan Communist Party

Europe
Coalition for Melilla, a political party in Melilla
Party of Communists of the Republic of Moldova
Congregatio Presbyterorum a Misericordia or Fathers of Mercy, a Catholic order in France

North America
Central Park Media, a U.S. entertainment company
Chicago Public Media, a National Public Radio member organization
Chosen People Ministries, a Messianic Jewish evangelical organization
Clement Payne Movement, a Barbadian political party
Content Planning Module, a component of the U.S. Navy's Authoring Instructional Materials

Science, technology, and medicine

Biology and medicine
Carboxypeptidase M, an enzyme
Cellular Potts model, a computer simulation of cellular structures
Central pontine myelinolysis, a neurological disease
Certified Professional Midwife, a direct-entry midwife certification
Chinese patent medicine, herbal medicines in Traditional Chinese medicine
Chlorphenamine, an antihistamine drug
Confined placental mosaicism, a condition of pregnancy
Continuous passive motion, a physical therapy technique
CPM (gene), the human gene to encode carboxypeptidase M 
Cucurbit powdery mildew, a fungal infection of melons and cucumbers
Cyclopropylmescaline, a psychedelic drug

Computing
CP/M, an early microcomputer operating system
Compressed pattern matching, string searches within uncompressed text

Communications Processor Module, a networking engine in Motorola/Freescale QUICC processors
Characters per minute, the speed of a typist; WPM (words per minute) is CPM divided by five
Cloud management platform software, in cloud computing
Combinatorial pattern matching, a research area (and a conference) for algorithms

Other uses in science and technology
Clique percolation method, a clustering algorithm for networks
Continuous phase modulation, a data modulation method commonly used in wireless modems
Counts per minute, a unit of radioactivity
Cpm, a process capability index
CPM S30V steel, a martensite form of steel
Cycle per minute, a unit similar to revolution per minute

Other uses
Challenge ProMode Arena, a modification to the game Quake III Arena 
Church planting movement
Colonial Police Medal
Communication privacy management theory, a theory of privacy in interpersonal communication
Compton/Woodley Airport (IATA code CPM)